The genus Leptorhynchos may refer to:
Leptorhynchos (dinosaur), a dinosaur genus in the family Caenagnathidae
Leptorhynchos (plant), a plant genus in the family Asteraceae